Articles related to the Sun include:
Corona
Solar wind
Coronal mass ejection(CME)
Solar eclipse
total eclipse
annular eclipse
hybrid eclipse
partial eclipse
Magnitude of eclipse
Saros (astronomy)
Sunspot, where most solar flares and coronal mass ejections originate
Wolf number, counts sunspots
Maunder Minimum, the period roughly spanning 1645 to 1715 when sunspots became exceedingly rare
Solar flare
Solar cycle, periodic change in the amount of irradiation from the Sun that is experienced on Earth
List of solar cycles
Solar maximum - large numbers of sunspots appear
Solar minimum - sunspot and solar flare activity diminishes
Homeric Minimum
Dalton Minimum, lasting from about 1790 to 1830
Modern Maximum, period of relatively high solar activity that began circa 1900
Solar physics, study of all related physical processes
Solar variation, change in the amount of solar radiation emitted
Solar System
Solar and celestial effects on climate (Earth's climate, that is)

Redirects
Sunlight
Solar radiation
Solar output - Direct measurements of solar irradiance, or solar output, have been available from satellites only since the late 1970s. These measurements show a very small peak-to-peak variation in solar irradiance (roughly 0.1 percent of the 1,366 watts per square metre received at the top of the atmosphere, for approximately 0.12 watt per square metre). Encyclopædia Britannica
Solar brightness => solar luminosity
Solar flux => Radiant flux
Solar disk => Photosphere
Aurora borealis => Aurora (astronomy)

See also
 The Sun is a G-type main-sequence star
Solar irradiance
 Sunlight, including the visible spectrum, infrared, ultraviolet, and any other wavelength of electromagnetic radiation the Sun gives off
 Insolation, solar radiation energy received on a given surface area during a given time
 Direct insolation, solar irradiance which reaches a location on the Earth after absorption and scattering in the atmosphere
 Total solar irradiance => Solar cycle
Solar variation
Sunspots
Solar flares
Solar wind
Solar storm
Solar flare, a large explosion in the Sun's atmosphere
Coronal mass ejection (CME), a massive burst of solar wind associated with solar flares
Geomagnetic storm, the interaction of the Sun's outburst with Earth's magnetic field
Solar variability (disambiguation)

Sun